The Grass Valley of Pershing and Humboldt counties in northern Nevada, United States, is a  long valley. The north section of the valley is part of the southwest portion of Winnemucca on the Humboldt River. The census-designated place of Grass Valley, with a population of 1,161, occupies the central  of the valley.

The valley was named for the grass used for grazing.

Description
Grass Valley trends north-northwest and is nestled between two mountain ranges on the Humboldt River's south. The East Range is southwest, the Sonoma Range is north-northeast. The valley narrows at its south-southeast with the north terminus hills of the Tobin Range meeting the Sonoma Range.

The center of the valley is approximately just southwest of Clear Creek Ranch at the west foothills of the Sonoma Range.

Access
The north of Grass Valley is traversed by Nevada State Route 294; for  into the valley it is paved. It becomes the unimproved road, Grass Valley Road, and goes through the valley center-east near the mountain foothills;  further it reaches Goldbanks (site) at the south terminus of Grass Valley, the northwest region of the Tobin Range. Grass Valley Road continues south through Pleasant Valley, and then enters the north of Dixie Valley, (and Churchill County).

See also

 List of valleys of Nevada

References

External links

 Grass Valley, lat-long.com (coordinates, elev. 4301 ft)

Valleys of Humboldt County, Nevada
Valleys of Pershing County, Nevada